Ennai   is a village in the Annavasal revenue block of Pudukkottai district, Tamil Nadu, India.

Demographics 

As per the 2001 census, Ennai had a total population of 5617 with 2790 males and 2827 females. Out of the total population 2620    people were literate.

References

Villages in Pudukkottai district